Gemeinde Schomberg (Polish: Gmina Szombierki), was a municipality in the District of Beuthen, part of the Silesian Province of Germany. Its seat was the town of Schomberg (now a district of Bytom).

History
During the Upper Silesian plebiscite in 1921, 3328 people in the Schomberg municipality took part in the voting.

Results:

Even though the majority of Schomberg's residents voted to join Poland, the village remained under German rule after the plebiscite era.

In 1930 the municipality became the owner of the Fazaniec Park.

The municipality of Schomberg ceased to exist in 1945 following the Polish takeover of Silesia. Under the new Polish administration a new municipality (Gmina) was formed in Schomberg and the town's name was changed to Chruszczów.

Demographics
Population of the municipality (Gemeinde) of Schomberg:

Nationality (according to the German census of 1910):

See also
 Old Town Hall, Szombierki

References

Sources
 http://www.territorial.de/obschles/beuthtar/beuthtar.htm
 http://www.gemeindeverzeichnis.de/gem1900/gem1900.htm?schlesien/beuthen.htm
 https://treemagic.org/rademacher/www.verwaltungsgeschichte.de/beuthen.html
 Wyniki plebiscytu na Górnym Śląsku. Dziewulski, Stefan. Warszawa 1922.

Bytom
Szombierki